Berkenthin is an Amt ("collective municipality") in the district of Lauenburg, in Schleswig-Holstein, Germany. Its seat is in Berkenthin.

The Amt Berkenthin consists of the following municipalities (population in 2005 between brackets):

Behlendorf (393)
Berkenthin (2,027)
Bliestorf (693)
Düchelsdorf (159)
Göldenitz (229)
Kastorf (1,146)
Klempau (601)
Krummesse (1,566)
Niendorf bei Berkenthin (187)
Rondeshagen (864)
Sierksrade (308)

Ämter in Schleswig-Holstein